Luiji Vilain (born March 10, 1998) is an American football outside linebacker for the Minnesota Vikings of the National Football League (NFL).

Early life and education
Vilain was born on March 10, 1998, in Ottawa, Ontario. He attended Episcopal High School in Virginia. As a junior, he recorded 60 tackles, 15.5 , 4.5 sacks, three forced fumbles and one recovered, earning second-team All-USA Virginia by USA Today and first-team All-IAC. As a senior, Vilain made 45 tackles and eight sacks as well as a fumble recovered in the end zone for a touchdown. He was named first-team All-USA by USA Today, first-team All-Met by The Washington Post, and first-team All-IAC. He was invited to the Under Armour All-America Game and was a PrepStar Top 359 All-American player. Scout.com ranked him the top defensive end in Virginia and a four-star recruit. He was a four-star prospect according to ESPN, and was named the second-best player in Virginia, as well as the 102nd best nationally.

Vilain committed to the University of Michigan after graduating from Episcopal High School. In his first two seasons (2017, freshman; 2018, sophomore), he did not see any game action. He was an Academic All-Big Ten selection in 2018. Prior to his junior year, Vilain moved from Toronto to the United States. As a junior in 2019, he played in seven games as a defensive lineman and made seven tackles, one TFL, one sack, and one forced fumble, earning his first varsity letter. As a senior in the 2020 season, Vilain appeared in five games, recording four tackles for a second varsity letter.

In 2021, Vilain announced his intention to transfer. He transferred to Wake Forest for his fifth season, being given an extra year of eligibility due to the COVID-19 pandemic. In May, he was drafted in the third round (25th overall) of the Canadian Football League (CFL) Draft by the Toronto Argonauts, but chose to remain in college.

As a fifth-year senior with Wake Forest in 2021, Vilain recorded a team-leading 9.0 sacks while also making 10.0 tackles-for-loss. He was one of three Wake Forest players to have double-digit TFLs and had a streak of four consecutive games with a sack.

Professional career
After going unselected in the 2022 NFL Draft, Vilain was signed as an undrafted free agent by the Minnesota Vikings. Kwity Paye, an All-Rookie defensive lineman with the Indianapolis Colts, who was roommates with Vilain at Michigan, said "I think the Vikings got a big steal getting him in free agency. He's just that type of player where I feel he didn't get his fair chance at Michigan, but he’s going to definitely maximize his opportunity and give the Vikings everything he has. He's an extremely gifted athlete." After having a solid training camp and impressing in preseason with a fumble return and interception, he made the Vikings' final roster.

References

External links
 Minnesota Vikings bio
 Michigan Wolverines bio
 Wake Forest Demon Deacons bio

1998 births
Living people
American football linebackers
American football defensive linemen
Black Canadian players of American football
Sportspeople from Ottawa
Michigan Wolverines football players
Wake Forest Demon Deacons football players
Minnesota Vikings players
Episcopal High School (Alexandria, Virginia) alumni